The Voice Nigeria Season 2 is the second season of the Nigerian version of the TV series The Voice. It was broadcast on Africa Magic from 18 June 2017 and was sponsored by Airtel and Coca-Cola. The winner earned a recording contract with Universal Music Group, an SUV car worth N7 million and a trip to Abu Dhabi.''

Idyl was the winner of this season, marking Dakolo's first win. This was the first time of having a male winner and also the first of having a male winning coach.

Coaches and hosts
2Baba didn't return as a coach. Yemi Alade replaced him marking her first season as a coach. Waje, Timi Dakolo and Patoranking all returned for their second season on the show. Stephanie Coker and IK Osakioduwa both returned for their second season as hosts.

Teams
Color key

Battles
The Battles advisors were Bez and Darey for all teams. Bez coached the artists on their vocals while Darey coached them on their stage performance.

Coaches could steal two losing artists and advance them to the next round. Coach Timi made an exception as he paired three acts together to battle because he turned for "Tara & Bella" after his team was full in the blind auditions.

At the end of the battles each coach had six original artists and two stolen artists making up eight advancing artists on their team.

Color key

Live shows

Top 32
The live shows kicked off with solo performances by the Top 32 artists, with two artists from each team advancing based on their coach's choice while two from the remaining six artists advanced based on public's vote.
Each team had four advancing artists, making a total of sixteen artists advancing to the next round.

Top 16

Semi-finals

Finale

Results summary
Result's colour key
 Artist was eliminated

Notes
: Shayee from team Yemi withdrew from the competition due to some reasons therefore his battle partner (Jahnomso) automatically advanced to the lives.

References 

Nigeria
2017 Nigerian television seasons